The 1965 Waterford Senior Hurling Championship was the 65th staging of the Waterford Senior Hurling Championship since its establishment by the Waterford County Board in 1897.

Mount Sion were the defending champions.

On 31 October 1965, Mount Sion won the championship after a 3-02 to 2-04 defeat of Ballygunner in the final. This was their 20th championship title overall and their third title in succession.

References

Waterford Senior Hurling Championship
Waterford Senior Hurling Championship